24 Horn Trios, Op. 82 is a collection of horn trios composed by Anton Reicha. The trios are scored for 3 horns or 2 horns and a bassoon. The work was published in Paris before 1815 (the exact date of publication is unknown) and is well established in the horn repertoire today.

Reicha was a flautist in his youth and composed a large number of works for wind instruments, among which were duos, trios and quartets for wind ensembles. Compositions for several identical instruments were apparently a particular favorite, as witnessed by, for example, flute quartets Op. 12 and Op. 27, or Variations for two flutes Op. 20. The trios of Op. 82 are part of this trend, and also reflect Reicha's interest in pedagogy, as well as his affinity for counterpoint. The collection is divided into four parts, six trios each. Numerous genres and forms are represented: there are canonic trios and a full-fledged fugue, a set of variations, dances such as minuet and musette, character pieces and short technical exercises or jokes such as Trio No. 15, subtitled Tritonus, in which the upper voice is restricted to using only the three tones.

List of trios 
 1er Livraison:
 Trio No. 1, Tempo di Minuetto
 Trio No. 2, Musétte. Allegro
 Trio No. 3, Adagio
 Trio No. 4, Menuetto. Trio
 Trio No. 5, Introduction. Adagio. Allegro
 Trio No. 6, Canon à 3. Tempo di minuetto
 2ème Livraison:
 Trio No. 7, Variations on the air Charmante Gabrielle. Andante. Variations 1–4
 Trio No. 8, Canon à 2. Andante
 Trio No. 9, Rondeau. Allegro
 Trio No. 10, Allegro
 Trio No. 11, Allegro
 Trio No. 12, Menuetto. Moderato assai. Trio
 3ème Livraison:
 Trio No. 13, Allegro
 Trio No. 14, Menuetto. Allegro assai. Trio
 Trio No. 15, Tritonus. Allegretto
 Trio No. 16, Mouvement de Marche
 Trio No. 17, Lento. Allegro
 Trio No. 18, Fugue. Allegro
 4ème Livraison:
 Trio No. 19, Lento
 Trio No. 20, Contrepoint double à l'Octave. Allegretto
 Trio No. 21, Allegro
 Trio No. 22, Lento sostenuto. Allegro spiritoso
 Trio No. 23, Menuetto grazioso. Trio
 Trio No. 24, Finale. Allegro scherzando

Recordings 
 Antonín Reicha: Trios for French Horns, Op. 82 (recorded 1988, released 1991). Zdeněk Tylšar, Bedřich Tylšar, Zdeněk Divoký (horns). Supraphon 11 1446-2
 Anton Reicha: 24 Trios pour trois cors, Op. 82 (1999). Deutsche Naturhorn Solisten (horns). DG, catalogue number MDG 605 0864-2

See also 
 List of compositions by Anton Reicha
 List of compositions for horn

Notes

External links 

Compositions by Anton Reicha
Reicha